En concert à l'Olympia is the first live album recorded by the French singer Hélène Ségara, and her third overall. It was released in October 2001, and was available first as a box set containing two CDs, then as a DVD. It achieved success in the countries where it was released.

The two CDs were recorded during the singer's first tour which led her at the Olympia of Paris from 23 to 26 October 2000. This live album contains songs from Ségara's first two albums, Cœur de verre and Au Nom d'une Femme, two songs from the musical Notre Dame de Paris in which Ségara portrayed Esméralda, and five tracks as bonus which are cover versions of Ségara's hits in Spanish-language, whose texts were written by the Spanish singer and songwriter Nilda Fernandez.

Track listing

 First CD

 Second CD

Credits

 Production and management : Orlando
 Artistic director (BG Productions) : Antoine Angelelli
 Original arrangements : Michel Coeuriot and Sandro Abaldonato
 Arrangements : Michel Coeuriot
 Musicians :
 Bass : David Lefèvre
 Drum kit : Régis Cecarelli
 Keyboards : Frédéric Gaillardet, Cyril Barbessol
 Guitars : Thomas Coeuriot
 Chorister percussion : Dany Vasnier
 Chorister : Marie Do Luce
 Track 10, CD 2 :
 Made by Pascal Obispo and P.Jaconelli
 Strings arrangements : M.Coeuriot
 Recordings and mixings : S.Forward (Studio Plus XXX) and S.Briand (Studio Guillaume Tell)

Charts and sales

Peak positions

Year-end charts

Certifications

References

Hélène Ségara albums
Albums recorded at the Olympia (Paris)
2006 live albums
Warner Music France albums